Stockholm International Youth Science Seminar (SIYSS) is an annual weeklong event for young international scientists, arranged in connection with the Nobel festivities by the SIYSS Committee of the Swedish Federation of Young Scientists.

The history of SIYSS dates back to 1976 when the first seminar was organized by the Swedish Federation of Young Scientists, with inspiration from Society for Science & the Public in USA. Turning out a great success, the SIYSS program has continued, combining the encounter with Swedish science and the Nobel Prize Awarding Ceremonies with an intense social program ever since then.

The program aims to promote international understanding and friendship, bringing together young people from all over the world with similar interests. The participants are selected in different ways; some are winners of national science fairs, others represent organizations for young scientists or are selected by merit at their home universities. Whatever their background, they all have two things in common: a great interest in natural sciences and a curiosity for other cultures and people.

Following the COVID-19 pandemic the program was - for the first time in its history - completely digital.

SIYSS Committee
The seminar and the social program is organized by a committee of volunteers, which is recruited by the Swedish Federation of Young Scientists.

Previous committees

2019: Sara Svanberg, Emma Svedenblad, Karin Cederberg, Marina Peltonen, Tintin Torin, Lisa Weyhenmeyer, Emanuel Enberg, Avital Cherednik, Julia Reinius, Virág Angyal, Elizabeth Vaisbourd, Emma Pettersson

2020: Emma Svedenblad, Johanna Lidholm, Virág Angyal, Dina Lerjevik, Najma Omar, Tintin Torin, Emanuel Enberg

Participating countries
Scientists from the following countries have participated in the SIYSS as of 2009:

  Australia
  China
  Denmark
  Hungary
  India
  Israel
  Japan
  Mexico
  Norway
  Poland
  Russia
  Singapore
  South Africa
  South Korea
  Switzerland
  United Kingdom
  United States

Also, every year winners of the EU Contest and the Intel ISEF participate in the event.

Previous participants 
2019: Flórián Vámosi, Adrien Jathe, Juliana Davoglio Estradioto, Nikolai Tiedemann, Shunyu Yao, Timo Hoffman, Shicheng Hu, Youngjoon Han, Adam Kelly, Elena Su, Aaron Coe, Malin Mueller, June Park, Simon Scholtz, Dionne Argyropoulos, Johan Nordstrand, Yee Lin Tan, Aleksei Beliakov, Felix Christian Sewing, Alex Korocencev, Taiyo Ishikawa, Fumika Moria, Ariel Ben Dor, Sophya Vershinina, Patricio Moscoso Ramirez

2020: Christopher Ong Xianbo, Lihuang Ding, Mengyang Li, Chenxi Zeng, Luciana Marconi, Cynthia Chen, Hannah Nelson, Cédric Willemin, John Migliore, Annie Ostojic, Lillian Petersen, MinJae Kim, Martin Morales Trejo

See also
 LIYSF

References

External links
 Stockholm International Youth Science Seminar official site

Youth science
Science events in Sweden
Annual events in Sweden
1976 establishments in Sweden
Recurring events established in 1976
Events in Stockholm